John Laurentius Gustaf Adolf Bergström (4 July 1884 – 9 February 1938), known as Gustaf Bergström, was a Swedish football player who competed in the 1908 Summer Olympics. In the 1908 tournament, he was a part of the Swedish football team that finished in 4th place. His brother, Erik Bergström, competed in the 1912 Summer Olympics.

References

External links
 
 

1884 births
1938 deaths
Swedish footballers
Sweden international footballers
Olympic footballers of Sweden
Footballers at the 1908 Summer Olympics
Association football forwards
Örgryte IS players